Grégbeu is a town in west-central Ivory Coast. It is a sub-prefecture of Zoukougbeu Department in Haut-Sassandra Region, Sassandra-Marahoué District.

Grégbeu was a commune until March 2012, when it became one of 1126 communes nationwide that were abolished.

In 2014, the population of the sub-prefecture of Grégbeu was 18,487.

Villages
The 9 villages of the sub-prefecture of Grégbeu and their population in 2014 are:
 Bahigbeu 1 (824)
 Bahigbeu 2 (1 090)
 Dahirougbeu (420)
 Dèdègbeu (2 332)
 Grègbeu (6 469)
 Guéguigbeu 1 (1 737)
 Guéguigbeu 2 (1 274)
 Liabo (2 703)
 Zoukpangbeu (1 638)

Notes

Sub-prefectures of Haut-Sassandra
Former communes of Ivory Coast